Rural–urban proportional representation (RUP), also called Flexible District PR, is a hybrid proportional system designed by Fair Vote Canada with the intention of meeting the special challenges of Canada's geography, which includes wide-flung, sparsely populated areas. As conceived in general terms by Fair Vote Canada, the rural–urban proportional model combines the use of multi-member ridings and top-up seats to meet the different needs of both rural and urban areas, while protecting the objective of proportionality. Sweden, Denmark and Iceland use similar voting models.

A version of rural–urban proportional was proposed in 2018 as one of three systems which could have been adopted in British Columbia had voters decided to adopt a proportional voting system in a 2018 referendum in the province. This version of rural–urban proportional would have used single transferable vote (STV) in urban and semi-urban areas and mixed-member proportional representation (MMP) in rural areas.

Rural–urban proportional is the only proportional voting system proposed in BC's 2018 electoral reform referendum to include an approach previously used in Canada. Alberta and Manitoba used STV in major cities and single-member ridings in rural areas to elect provincial members of the Legislative Assembly (MLAs) for 30 years.

In a country like Canada, which already has some ridings of considerable geographic size, rural–urban proportional allows for the creation of smaller multi-member ridings, or even the retention of some single-member ridings, in rural areas. In more densely-populated areas, it gives voters more choice of candidates to choose from and ensures representation by a number of elected representatives from different parties or points of view, including independents. The use of ranked ballot under the single transferable vote allows voters to more fully express their preferences than otherwise.

Background
Rural–urban proportional was devised in response to a suggestion made by former Chief Electoral Officer Jean-Pierre Kingsley to the House of Commons Special Committee on Electoral Reform on July 7, 2016. He proposed the idea of having proportional multi-member ridings of 4–5 representatives in urban areas while retaining single-member ridings in rural areas.

Proposed usage in Canada
A version of rural–urban proportional was proposed as one of three PR systems to be adopted in British Columbia (BC) had voters decided to adopt a proportional voting system in a 2018 referendum in the province. It was the only proportional voting system proposed in BC's 2018 electoral reform referendum to include a proportional voting system previously used in Canada: Alberta and Manitoba used multi-member STV in major cities to elect provincial members of the Legislative Assembly (MLAs) for 30 years from the 1920s to the 1950s. This approach produced proportional outcomes in the cities where STV was used, but not in rural areas, which used STV's non-proportional single-member equivalent, instant-runoff voting (IRV), in single-member ridings. As a result, and because rural seats comprised a large proportion of the total, the overall election results under this system were not proportional. Rural–urban proportional as proposed for BC would have had similar combination of two electoral systems but would use mixed-member proportional in rural areas, which would ensure proportional results province-wide.

Comparison to other proportional systems
As originally conceived by Fair Vote Canada, rural–urban proportional requires the incorporation of fewer top-up seats compared to MMP because the use of multi-member ridings would include a more proportional base to begin with. It is estimated that only 10–15% top-up seats would be needed, versus 40% under MMP.

The inclusion of the rural–urban proportional option in the BC referendum reflects lessons learned from previous referendums in British Columbia and other Canadian jurisdictions, particularly with respect to concerns about previously proposed systems requiring vast rural ridings to achieve proportionality.

Design and operation
Rural–urban PR as envisaged for BC is a hybrid of two electoral options for achieving proportional representation: STV and MMP. Urban areas would use the single transferable vote for elections and rural areas would use the mixed-member proportional system.

In urban and semi-urban areas using STV, existing urban ridings would join together to form multi-member ridings and typically electing 3–7 MLAs using ranked ballot. The candidates elected would reflect the popular vote of the voters in these larger, multi-member ridings. The use of a ranked ballot permits a high degree of voter choice by permitting voters to rank preferences for multiple candidates. For urban and semi-urban voters, this makes rural–urban proportional very similar to BC-STV.

In rural ridings using MMP, voters would have two votes: one to elect their local MLA, and another that would be used to elect a regional MLA to ensure the proportionality of overall results in rural regions. Their first vote on the ballot would be used to elect a local MLA in the same way as the current first-past-the-post (FPTP) electoral system: the candidate with the most votes would be elected. The second vote would be used in either an open list or closed list system in which voters select either a candidate or party to represent them at a regional level. However, it is expected that only open list have any real likelihood of being implemented. These regional MLAs are used as "top-ups" so that overall proportionality is achieved in rural regional areas, given the lack of proportionality that results from first-past-the-post elections. Top-up MLAs would be elected using regional party lists. A commitment has been made that no region will lose ridings under any of the three proposed electoral systems in the 2018 electoral reform referendum.

Support
Rural–urban proportional was one of three "made-in-Canada" systems endorsed by Fair Vote Canada in its submission to the 2016 Special Parliamentary Committee on Electoral Reform. The other two were MMP and STV. Fair Voting BC gave rural–urban proportional its highest ranking in its scorecard of proportional voting systems. During the federal government's consultation on electoral reform at the federal level in 2016, both the New Democratic Party of Canada and Green Party of Canada recommended Canada adopt either RUP or MMP.

References

External links
How We Vote Consultation website

Proportional representation electoral systems
Electoral reform in Canada
Preferential electoral systems
Mixed electoral systems